The John Deere World Headquarters is a complex of four buildings located on 1,400 acres (5.7 km2) of land at One John Deere Place, Moline, Illinois, United States. The complex serves as corporate headquarters for agricultural heavy equipment company John Deere.

History 
The complex opened on April 20, 1964. The buildings were designed by the Finnish-American architect Eero Saarinen, who died before its construction was complete, only four days after he signed the contract for the newest buildings. The project was finished by architect Kevin Roche. It was built according to Deere & Company President William Hewitt's instructions using COR-TEN weathering steel—one of the first architectural applications of the material—which gave the building an earthy look as it oxidized and aged. In celebration of the 2018 Illinois Bicentennial, the John Deere World Headquarters was selected as one of the Illinois 200 Great Places  by the American Institute of Architects Illinois component (AIA Illinois) and was recognized by USA Today Travel magazine, as one of AIA Illinois' selections for Illinois 25 Must See Places.

Building and amenities
Within the building are offices for over 900 staff and an auditorium with 350 seats. 

The grounds are open seven days a week and are free to all. The building interior is closed to the public.

Landscape
The design for the campus was created by Hideo Sasaki of Sasaki Associates landscape architecture firm. The design picked up an ASLA Classic Award in 1991 and is considered by many to be the archetypal corporate setting.

External links
 John Deere Headquarters on Architectuul
 John Deere Gift shop at World Headquarters
Illinois Great Places - John Deere World Headquarters
Society of Architectural Historians SAH ARCHIPEDIA entry on John Deere World Headquarters

References

John Deere
Buildings and structures in Moline, Illinois
Eero Saarinen structures
Tourist attractions in the Quad Cities
Office buildings completed in 1964
1964 establishments in Illinois
Weathering steel
Corporate headquarters in the United States
Tourist attractions in Rock Island County, Illinois